Kadhal Palli is a 1997 Indian Tamil language comedy drama film directed by Pavithran. The film stars Vignesh, Suvaluxmi, Vaiyapuri, Sukran and Jawahar, with Bhaskar Raj, Vichithra, Vinu Chakravarthy and Kumarimuthu playing supporting roles. It was released on 15 August 1997.

Plot

Balu (Vignesh), Palli (Vaiyapuri), Gold (Sukran) and Kandhan (Jawahar) are good friends and small-time crooks in Ooty, they pretend to be tourist guides and then they rip off the tourists. They are often helped by the village belle Mynaa who gave them money and food. One day, Balu finds the young women Uma in a container lorry. Uma doesn't know the city, so she asks Balu to bring her to the restaurant and the hotel to stay. His three friends then follow them and they are all ejected from the restaurant and the hotel. The five eventually eat at a wedding function and sleep in the street. Afterwards, Uma seduces the four friends individually and even promises them that she will marry them. The five spend time together and sleep in the same room. In the meantime, the police are looking for Uma.

One day, Uma faints and the doctor informs her that she is pregnant. The four friends pretend to be the father of the baby but Uma refuses to accept it. What transpires next forms the rest of the story.

Cast

Vignesh as Balu
Suvaluxmi as Uma
Vaiyapuri as Palli
Sukran as Gold
Jawahar as Kandhan
Bhaskar Raj as Sanjay
Vichithra as Mynaa
Vinu Chakravarthy
Kumarimuthu as Kirupakaran
Prathapachandran
Junior Balaiah
Pasi Narayanan
Vimalraj as Vimal
Rani

Production
Laila Mehdin opted out of the film and was replaced by Suvaluxmi.

Soundtrack

The film score and the soundtrack were composed by Deva. The soundtrack, released in 1997, features 5 tracks with lyrics written by Vairamuthu and Vaasan.

Reception
The film failed both commercially and critically with the film director Pavithran stating, "My only intention was to give the producer some profit. But finally I could satisfy nobody, both the producer and my fans".

References 

1997 films
Films scored by Deva (composer)
1990s Tamil-language films
Indian comedy-drama films
1997 comedy-drama films